Multiway branch is the change to a program's control flow based upon a value matching a selected criteria. It is a form of conditional statement. A multiway branch is often the most efficient method of passing control to one of a set of program labels, especially if an index has been created beforehand from the raw data.

Examples
 Branch table
 Switch statement  - see also alternatives below
 Multiple dispatch - where a subroutine is invoked and a return is made

Alternatives
A multiway branch can, frequently, be replaced with an efficient indexed table lookup (using the data value itself or a calculated derivative of the data value, as the index of an array)
"...the implementation of a switch statement has been equated with that of a multiway branch. However, for many uses of the switch statement in real code, it is possible to avoid branching altogether and replace the switch with one or more table look-ups. For example,the Has30Days example [presented earlier] can be implemented as the following:[C example]""A Superoptimizer Analysis of Multiway Branch Code Generation" by Roger Anthony Sayle
 switch (x) {                     /* x is month no */
   case 4:                        /* April         */                             
   case 6:                        /* June          */
   case 9:                        /* September     */
   case 11:                       /* November      */
   return true;
 }
can be replaced, using a "safe-hashing" technique, with -
 unsigned int t = x | 2;
 switch (t) {
   case 6:
   case 11:
   return true;
 }
or it can be replaced, using an index mapping table lookup, with -
 x %= 12;                                           /* to ensure x is in range 0-11*/                                                 
 static const int T[12] ={0,0,0,0,1,0,1,0,0,1,0,1}; /* 0-based table 'if 30 days =1,else 0'  */
 return T[x];                                       /* return with boolean 1 = true, 0=false */
(in view of the simplicity of the latter case, it would be preferable to implement it in-line, since the overhead of using a function call may be greater than the indexed lookup itself.)

Quotations

See also
Conditional (programming)
Lookup table

References

External links
Coding Multiway Branches Using Customized Hash functions by H. G. Dietz
Learning Python By Mark Lutz
Programming in C++ By Nell B. Dale, Chip Weems
A Superoptimizer Analysis of Multiway Branch Code Generation by Roger Anthony Sayle

Conditional constructs